Ainsley Robinson (born December 6, 1971) is a Canadian mixed martial artist and former Olympic wrestler. He also owns Toronto Top Team Fitness/Martial Arts located in Scarborough, Ontario.

Olympic career
Born in Oshawa, Ontario, Robinson competed in the 1996 Olympics in the Men's Greco-Roman 62 kg where he recorded losses to David Zuniga and Choi Sang-Sun.

MMA career
Robinson has competed in the Bellator Fighting Championships (losing to Chad Laprise) and King of the Cage.

References

External links
 

1971 births
Living people
Sportspeople from Oshawa 
Wrestlers at the 1996 Summer Olympics
Canadian male sport wrestlers
Olympic wrestlers of Canada
Canadian male mixed martial artists
Mixed martial artists utilizing Greco-Roman wrestling